Macedonia most commonly refers to:
 North Macedonia, a country in southeastern Europe, known until 2019 as the Republic of Macedonia
 Macedonia (ancient kingdom), a kingdom in Greek antiquity
 Macedonia (Greece), a former administrative region, spanning today three administrative subdivisions of northern Greece
 Macedonia (region), a geographic and historical region that today includes parts of six Balkan countries (see map)

Macedonia, Makedonia, Makedonija, or Makedoniya may also refer to:

Other historical entities
 Achaemenid Macedonia, a satrapy of Achaemenid Empire
 Diocese of Macedonia, a late Roman administrative unit
 Independent Macedonia (1944), a proposed puppet state of the Axis powers (1944)
 Macedonia (Roman province), a province of the early Roman Empire
 Macedonia (theme), a province of the Byzantine Empire
 Socialist Republic of Macedonia, a part of the former Yugoslavia (1945–1991) and a predecessor of North Macedonia

Other geographical uses

Within the region
Aegean Macedonia, a geographic region equivalent to modern Greek Macedonia
Vardar Macedonia, a geographic region corresponding roughly to the territory of North Macedonia
Pirin Macedonia, a geographic region of southwestern Bulgaria
Central Macedonia, a province in northern Greece
Eastern Macedonia and Thrace, a province in northern Greece
Western Macedonia, a province in northern Greece

United States
 Macedonia, Alabama
 Macedonia, Georgia
 Macedonia, Illinois
 Macedonia, Indiana
 Macedonia, Iowa
 Macedonia, Kentucky
 Macedonia, Missouri
 Macedonia, New Jersey
 Macedonia, Ohio
 Macedonia, South Carolina
 Macedonia, Tennessee
 Macedonia, Liberty County, Texas
 Macedonia, Williamson County, Texas
 Macedonia, Virginia

Others
 Macedônia, São Paulo, Brazil
 Macedonia, a village of Ciacova, Romania
 Macedonia, area of Glenrothes, Scotland, United Kingdom

Publications
 Makedonia (newspaper), a Greek newspaper established in 1911
 Makedoniya (Bulgarian newspaper), a 19th-century Bulgarian newspaper published until 1872
 Macedonia (comics), a 2007 book by Harvey Pekar and Heather Roberson

Ships
, a Greek passenger liner that was renamed Pincio in 1922
, a Bulgarian cargo ship in service 1932–41
, a Greek passenger ship in service 1984–85

Sports
 FK Makedonija Gjorče Petrov, a football club in Skopje
 FC Macedonia, a former football club in Skopje (1941 to 1944)
 Preston Makedonia, an association football club in Melbourne, Australia, officially known since mid-1990s as the Preston Lions but still identified with the Macedonian-Australian community
 Stirling Macedonia FC, an association football club in Perth, Australia

Other uses
 Makedonia (dance), a Greek folk song
 Macedonia (food), a fruit salad or vegetable dish
 Macedonia (terminology)
 Macedonia Airport or Thessaloniki International Airport, an airport in Thessaloniki, Greece
 Makedonia TV, a Greek television station

See also
 Eastern Macedonia (disambiguation)
 Western Macedonia (disambiguation)
 Languages of Macedonia (disambiguation)
 Macedonian language (disambiguation)
 Macedonian (disambiguation)
 Macedon (disambiguation)
 Macedonia naming dispute
 United Macedonia